In machine learning, early stopping is a form of regularization used to avoid overfitting when training a learner with an iterative method, such as gradient descent. Such methods update the learner so as to make it better fit the training data with each iteration. Up to a point, this improves the learner's performance on data outside of the training set. Past that point, however, improving the learner's fit to the training data comes at the expense of increased generalization error. Early stopping rules provide guidance as to how many iterations can be run before the learner begins to over-fit. Early stopping rules have been employed in many different machine learning methods, with varying amounts of theoretical foundation.

Background
This section presents some of the basic machine-learning concepts required for a description of early stopping methods.

Overfitting

Machine learning algorithms train a model based on a finite set of training data. During this training, the model is evaluated based on how well it predicts the observations contained in the training set. In general, however, the goal of a machine learning scheme is to produce a model that generalizes, that is, that predicts previously unseen observations. Overfitting occurs when a model fits the data in the training set well, while incurring larger generalization error.

Regularization

Regularization, in the context of machine learning, refers to the process of modifying a learning algorithm so as to prevent overfitting. This generally involves imposing some sort of smoothness constraint on the learned model.
This smoothness may be enforced explicitly, by fixing the number of parameters in the model, or by augmenting the cost function as in Tikhonov regularization. Tikhonov regularization, along with principal component regression and many other regularization schemes, fall under the umbrella of spectral regularization, regularization characterized by the application of a filter. Early stopping also belongs to this class of methods.

Gradient descent methods

Gradient descent methods are first-order, iterative, optimization methods. Each iteration updates an approximate solution to the optimization problem by taking a step in the direction of the negative of the gradient of the objective function. By choosing the step-size appropriately, such a method can be made to converge to a local minimum of the objective function. Gradient descent is used in machine-learning by defining a loss function that reflects the error of the learner on the training set and then minimizing that function.

Early stopping based on analytical results

Early stopping in statistical learning theory
Early-stopping can be used to regularize non-parametric regression problems encountered in machine learning.

One common choice for approximating the regression function is to use functions from a reproducing kernel Hilbert space. These spaces can be infinite dimensional, in which they can supply solutions that overfit training sets of arbitrary size. Regularization is, therefore, especially important for these methods. One way to regularize non-parametric regression problems is to apply an early stopping rule to an iterative procedure such as gradient descent.

The early stopping rules proposed for these problems are based on analysis of upper bounds on the generalization error as a function of the iteration number. They yield prescriptions for the number of iterations to run that can be computed prior to starting the solution process.

Example: Least-squares loss
(Adapted from Yao, Rosasco and Caponnetto, 2007)

Let  and  Given a set of samples

where,  is a member of the reproducing kernel Hilbert space . That is, minimize the expected risk for a Least-squares loss function. Since  depends on the unknown probability measure , it cannot be used for computation. Instead, consider the following empirical risk

Let  and  be the t-th iterates of gradient descent applied to the expected and empirical risks, respectively, where both iterations are initialized at the origin, and both use the step size .

We want to control the difference between the expected risk of the sample iteration and the minimum expected risk, that is, the expected risk of the regression function:

This difference can be rewritten as the sum of two terms: the difference in expected risk between the sample and population iterations and that between the population iteration and the regression function:

This equation presents a bias-variance tradeoff, which is then solved to give an optimal stopping rule that may depend on the unknown probability distribution. That rule has associated probabilistic bounds on the generalization error. For the analysis leading to the early stopping rule and bounds, the reader is referred to the original article. In practice, data-driven methods, e.g. cross-validation can be used to obtain an adaptive stopping rule.

Early stopping in boosting
Boosting refers to a family of algorithms in which a set of weak learners (learners that are only slightly correlated with the true process) are combined to produce a strong learner. It has been shown, for several boosting algorithms (including AdaBoost), that regularization via early stopping can provide guarantees of consistency, that is, that the result of the algorithm approaches the true solution as the number of samples goes to infinity.

L-boosting
Boosting methods have close ties to the gradient descent methods described above can be regarded as a boosting method based on the  loss: LBoost.

Validation-based early stopping
These early stopping rules work by splitting the original training set into a new training set and a validation set. The error on the validation set is used as a proxy for the generalization error in determining when overfitting has begun. These methods are most commonly employed in the training of neural networks. Prechelt gives the following summary of a naive implementation of holdout-based early stopping as follows:

More sophisticated forms use cross-validation – multiple partitions of the data into training set and validation set – instead of a single partition into a training set and validation set. Even this simple procedure is complicated in practice by the fact that the validation error may fluctuate during training, producing multiple local minima. This complication has led to the creation of many ad hoc rules for deciding when overfitting has truly begun.

See also
 Overfitting, early stopping is one of methods used to prevent overfitting
 Generalization error
 Regularization (mathematics)
 Statistical learning theory
 Boosting (machine learning)
 Cross-validation, in particular using a "validation set"
 Neural networks

References

Artificial neural networks